Alain-Charles Perrot (born 17 September 1945) is a French architect. He is the president of the Académie des Beaux-Arts.

He was made a Knight of the Légion d'honneur on 11 April 2001.
He was made a Commander of the Ordre des Arts et des Lettres on 16 January 2014.

References

French architects
1945 births
Living people
Chevaliers of the Légion d'honneur
Commandeurs of the Ordre des Arts et des Lettres